Tesfamariam (from ተስፋ (tesifa) "hope" and ማርያም (mariyami) "Mary") is an Eritrean and Ethiopian surname and given name. Notable people with the name include:

Given name
Tesfamariam Bedho (1934–2002), Eritrean bishop of the Ethiopian Catholic Church

Surname
Abel Tesfamariam (born 1995), Eritrean-Filipino alpine skier
Menghesteab Tesfamariam (born 1948), Eritrean bishop of the Eritrean Catholic Church
Yohannes Gebremeskel Tesfamariam (born 1960), Ethiopian general
Sophia Tesfamariam Yohannes Eritrean ambassador

References

Tigrinya-language names
Amharic-language names